Ranipur may refer to:

 Ranipur, Bangladesh, a village
 Ranipur, Sindh, a town in Pakistan
 Ranipur, Uttar Pradesh, a town in Jhansi district, Uttar Pradesh, India
 Ranipur-Jharial, an archaeological site in Odisha, India
 Ranipur, Uttarakhand, a town in Uttarakhand, India
 Mauranipur,  a town in Jhansi district, Uttar Pradesh, India
 Ranipur Sanctuary, a wildlife sanctuary in Banda District, Uttar Pradesh, India 
 Ranipur, Bihar, a village in Bihar, India
 Tawa Nagar in Madhya Pradesh, India; also known as Ranipur

See also 
 Ranapur
 Ranpur (disambiguation)